Denis Mesples (born 21 May 1963 in Désertines, Allier) is a French equestrian. At the 2012 Summer Olympics he competed in the Individual eventing.

References

External links 
 
 
 
 

1963 births
Living people
French male equestrians
Olympic equestrians of France
Equestrians at the 2012 Summer Olympics
Sportspeople from Allier